"Ain't No Stoppin' Us Now" is a 1979 disco song performed by American R&B duo McFadden & Whitehead, from their debut album McFadden & Whitehead. They wrote and produced the song along with keyboard player Jerry Cohen. McFadden & Whitehead would revisit the song in their 1984 single "Ain't No Stoppin' (Ain't No Way)".

Background
"Ain't No Stoppin' Us Now" is about succeeding despite having faced previous disadvantages ("so many things that held us down"). It was widely interpreted to be about the experience of the African American community, and after attaining popularity, became referred to as "the new black national anthem" (the original being the 1900 song "Lift Every Voice and Sing").

Kelefa Sanneh noted the song was, "an exuberant number often interpreted as an expression of Black pride", but also that the authors of the song were in a dispute over royalties with their record label Philadelphia International. Whitehead said, "If anything, the song was a declaration of our independence from Gamble."

Production
Despite being seen as social commentary, in an interview conducted by Philadelphia video producer Bob Lott, John and Gene revealed that the song was actually about their frustration with Philadelphia International Records owners Kenny Gamble and Leon Huff, who for many years preferred that they remain as house songwriters and not performers. Gamble has confirmed that upon first hearing "Ain't No Stoppin' Us Now", he tried unsuccessfully to convince McFadden and Whitehead to give the song to the O'Jays, as he felt it was better to write and produce for the prominent recording artists of the day than to try to compete with them as on-stage performers.

This song features a female Chorus in the repeated refrain. Electronic Beeping feedback sounds are heard towards the ending of the longer version of the song.

Chart performance
Released as the lead single from the album, the song spent a week at number one on the R&B singles chart. It also proved to be a successful crossover hit, peaking at number 13 on the Billboard Hot 100. The single also made it to number 10 on the disco charts, and reached number 5 in the UK. It eventually went double platinum, selling over 2 million copies.

Weekly singles charts

Year-end charts

References

1979 debut singles
1979 songs
Disco songs
Songs written by Gene McFadden
Songs written by John Whitehead (singer)
Philadelphia International Records singles